Wortegem-Petegem is a municipality located in the Belgian province of East Flanders. In 2021, Wortegem-Petegem had a total population of 6,445. The total area is 41.96 km2.

Villages
, Moregem, Petegem-aan-de-Schelde and Wortegem.

References

External links
 
 Official website of the municipality

 
Municipalities of East Flanders